Dadabima (The Hunting Ground) is a 2000 Sri Lankan Sinhala adult drama film directed by Louis Vanderstraaten and produced by Pradeep Palihawadana for Hanako Films. It stars Chanky Ipalawatta, Nimal Sumanasekara and Anusha Damayanthi in lead roles along with Robin Fernando and Tissa Wijesurendra. It is the 935th Sri Lankan film in the Sinhala cinema.

Plot

Cast
 Nimal Sumanasekara as Baladasa
 Chanky Ipalawatta as Wickrama
 Anusha Damayanthi
 Robin Fernando
 Tissa Wijesurendra
 Mark Samson as Jumbo
 Wasantha Kumaravila
 Wilson Karunaratne as Baladasa's associate
 Janesh Silva
 Kapila Sigera
 Upali Keerthisena
 Michelle Reimers as Tina
 Dhammika Pushpakumara
 Sanath Imbulamure
 Nalika Samaraweera
 Milton Kumaraperuma
 Lakmal Fonseka

References

2000 films
2000s Sinhala-language films
2000 drama films
Sri Lankan drama films